Major General Sergei Ivanovich Tiulpanov (Russian: Сергей Иванович Тюльпанов; 3 October 1901 – 16 February 1987) was a Soviet economist and the director of the Propaganda Administration of the Soviet Military Administration in Germany which governed eastern Germany from 1945–1949.

Tiulpanov spoke fluent German. He was a strong supporter of Walter Ulbricht and of the Sovietization of eastern Germany. He closely monitored the activities of the newly formed Socialist Unity Party of Germany, which was to govern the country.

Tiulpanov considered himself a hardline Bolshevik, and fell from favor as it became clear that Joseph Stalin did not support his and Ulbricht's plans for the rapid establishment of socialism in eastern Germany. Tiulpanov was recalled from his post to Moscow in 1949 on the basis that several members of his family and friends had been convicted of espionage.

References 

Loth, Wilfried. Stalin's Unwanted Child: The Soviet Union, the German Question, and the Founding of the GDR. New York: St. Martin's Press, 1998. (Translation of German Stalins ungeliebtes Kind, Rowohlt Verlag GmbH, 1994)

External links

A report Tiulpanov prepared for Moscow on the activities of the SED, and the communication requesting permission to dismiss him.
 

Russian politicians
Russian people of World War II
1901 births
1987 deaths
Soviet major generals
Soviet propagandists
Herzen University alumni
Burials at Serafimovskoe Cemetery
Academic staff of Herzen University